American Waterfront is a "port-of-call" (themed land) at Tokyo DisneySea in the Tokyo Disney Resort. It represents the Northeastern seaboard of the United States in the early 20th century, and features two themed areas, an Old Cape Cod section, and a New York Harbor section with an elaborate backstory.

Theming
The American Waterfront is themed to resemble a New York City enlivened by new immigrants, and the New England fishing community of Cape Cod.

New York is depicted as a bustling city during the 1910s, complete with an elevated railway, a classic American Theater and a harbor displaying a large range of boats, including the massive S.S. Columbia. This city's backstory revolves around the wealthy Harrison Hightower III, whose power grew stronger amid New York, as one can guess seeing his Hightower Hotel, symbol of his might until he mysteriously disappeared after retrieving a cursed African idol. His business rival Cornelius Endicott, owner of the S.S. Columbia ocean liner and a vast shipping empire has since picked up much of the slack, though his effort to tear down Hotel Hightower was blocked by his own daughter Beatrice. The Cape Cod area of American Waterfront is home to Disney's Duffy the Disney Bear character and his friends.

Attractions
 Big City Vehicles
 DisneySea Electric Railway
 DisneySea Transit Steamer Line
 Tower of Terror- Similar to the Disney California Adventure and Disney's Hollywood Studios versions of the attraction. Inside the Hightower Hotel, guests unravel the story and fright behind the disappearance of Harrison Hightower III after bringing in a cursed African idol named "Shiriki Utundu."
 Turtle Talk- Inside the S.S. Columbia, where guests meet Crush, from the Disney.Pixar movie Finding Nemo, as they look through an underwater window.
 Toy Story Mania!- The popular ride from Disney California Adventure and Disney's Hollywood Studios, based on the Toy Story movies, located within the Toyville Trolley Park sub-area.

Entertainment

Current 
 Big Band Beat (2006-present)
 Transit Steamer Greeting (2020-present)
 Jamboree Mickey! Let's Dance! (2019-present)

Past 
 Donald's Boat Builders (2001-2010)
 Sail Away (2001-2006)
 Encore! (2001-2006)
 Rhythms of the World (2004-2005, 2006)
 Cape Cod Step Out (2006-2007, 2009)
 Over the Waves (2006-2010)
 A Table is Waiting (2011-2017)
 Steps to Shine (2017-2018)
 Hello, New York! (2018-2020)
 My Friend Duffy (2010-2020)

Seasonal 

 That's Disneytainment with Mickey: Showbiz Is (2004)
 That's Disneytainment after Dark: Starlight Jazz (2004)
 Wishes (Part of Dramatic DisneySea Special Event, 2005)
 Mickey's Dream Company (Tokyo Disney Resort 25th Anniversary, 2009)
 Showtime Friends (2009)
 Disney in the Stars (2010)

Restaurants and refreshments
 S.S. Columbia Dining Room
 The Teddy Roosevelt Lounge
 Restaurant Sakura
 New York Deli
 Liberty Landing Diner
 Barnacle Bill's
 Papadakis Fresh Fruit
 High Tide Treats
 Delancey Catering
 Cape Cod Cook-Off

Shopping
 McDuck's Department Store
 Tower of Terror Memorabilia
 Steamboat Mickey's
 Aunt Peg's Village Store
 Newsie's Newsstand

References

External links
 TDR Fan – American Waterfront Photos

 
Themed areas in Walt Disney Parks and Resorts
Tokyo DisneySea
Amusement rides introduced in 2001